Geeking Out is an American  late night talk show comedy television series co-hosted by Kevin Smith and Greg Grunberg. It premiered on AMC on July 24, 2016, during San Diego Comic-Con International.

Premise
Kevin Smith and Greg Grunberg discuss pop culture through a fanboy perspective in this talk show that features celebrity interviews, clips, and out-of-studio segments.

Cast
Kevin Smith (co-host)
Greg Grunberg (co-host)
Tiffany Smith (field correspondent)

Production
In February 2016, Kevin Smith and Greg Grunberg teamed with AMC, The Weinstein Company, and Matador Content to co-host a late night talk show titled Geeking Out which is expected to premiere in July 2016, covering San Diego Comic-Con with 8 subsequent episodes running weekly.

On May 9, 2016, Deadline confirmed that the series would premiere on August 21, 2016, however, it was later revealed that the series would air on July 24, 2016.

On June 9, 2016, Smith revealed that director J. J. Abrams will be a guest on the show.

On July 7, 2016, AMC announced that the first episode will air on July 24, 2016 with hosts Smith and Grunberg heading to San Diego Comic-Con International.

Episodes

References

External links

 
 

2010s American late-night television series
2016 American television series debuts
2016 American television series endings
2010s American reality television series
Works by Kevin Smith
AMC (TV channel) original programming
Television series by Matador Content
Television shows about comics